Jacson da Paixão Neponuceno (born 16 December 1989), commonly known as Jacson, is a Brazilian professional footballer who currently plays for Iranian club Gostaresh Foulad F.C. as a forward.

References 

1989 births
Living people
Association football forwards
Brazilian footballers
Brazilian expatriate footballers
Esporte Clube Bahia players
Oeste Futebol Clube players
Colo Colo de Futebol e Regatas players
Gostaresh Foulad F.C. players
Campeonato Brasileiro Série A players